The Axilrod–Teller potential in molecular physics, is a three-body potential that results from a third-order perturbation correction to the attractive London dispersion interactions (instantaneous induced dipole-induced dipole)

References

Chemical bonding
Quantum mechanical potentials